Brisbane Street is a major cross street located in the suburb of Perth. It runs from Palmerston Street through to Bulwer Street, and intersects major roads Lake Street, William Street, and Beaufort Street. The section between Beaufort Street and Stirling Street was called Padbury Street until circa 1917. The street was named after Thomas Brisbane, Governor of New South Wales.

"Among other streets which Dr Battye said were named after English and Colonial public men were Aberdeen, Newcastle, Brisbane, Bulwer (Bulwer-Lyton), Moore, Short, Hill, Irwin, Hutt and Milligan Streets and Harvest Terrace."

The street had the McDowall's service station, as well as a Methodist church.

History
Parts of Brisbane Street formerly carried one-way traffic, and were converted to carry two-way traffic in 2019.

Intersections

References

Roads in Perth, Western Australia